The Jeantaud was a make of French automobile manufactured in Paris from 1893 until 1907. It was the brainchild of Charles Jeantaud, a coachbuilder who built his first electric carriage in 1881. Some cars had an unusual bevel-gear front-wheel-drive layout. From 1902 to 1904, Jeantaud offered a range of 2-, 3- and 4-cylinder gasoline-engined cars similar to 1898 Panhards.

The company ceased trading in 1906 following the suicide of its founder.

Specifications of record breaker

The 1899 Jeantaud Duc Profilée was powered by a  electric engine. Its record, though, was quickly broken by the more famous La Jamais Contente, the first purpose-built land speed record car, which reached  on the same day.

Gallery

References

External links
Picture of a Jeantaud
Drawing of a Phaëton électrique de Jeantaud 

Vehicles introduced in 1893
1890s cars
Defunct motor vehicle manufacturers of France
Electric land speed record cars
1890s in motorsport
Manufacturing companies based in Paris
Brass Era vehicles
Veteran vehicles